PKP class EP07 is a class of standard-gauge electric locomotives used primarily for passenger trains in Poland. They are rebuilt EU07 class locomotives, which in turn are the direct successors to the post-war British EU06 series locomotives. The only operators of this locomotive series are PKP Intercity and Polregio.

These locomotives constitute the vast majority of electric locomotives still serving the PKP Group today - they are used to drive both light and heavy passenger trains.

History
Since 1995, some EU07 locomotives  have undergone a reconstruction, in which new traction motors with a higher permissible operating temperature - LKb535 were installed and the gear-ratio was changed from 79:18 to 76:21. Modifications were carried out, among others..: ZNTK Oleśnica, ZNTK Mińsk Mazowiecki, HCP Poznań, "Newag" Nowy Sącz.

The change of gear ratio did not, however, increase the design speed (misaligned transmission system - hollow shaft bearing on slide bearings), but decreased the engine speed, making it difficult to drive freight trains with this locomotive. It has become easier to maintain the maximum speed of the locomotive while reducing breakdowns. Starting acceleration has also increased - especially at higher speeds, which is realized with less weakening of the excitation (and thus higher motor power). The new LKb535 traction motors, instead of EE541, are adapted to the higher permissible operating temperature. The maximum permitted engine speed for EE541b is 2390 rpm, for EU07 series locomotives with maximum axle rims and 120 km/h, traction engines reach 2380 rpm and EP07 engines in the same situation only reach 1962 rpm, which increases their durability. The rebuilt units kept their rolling stock number (e.g. the EU07-330 locomotive became the EP07-330 locomotive).

In December 2006, 74 EP07 and EU07 class locomotives belonging to PKP Cargo were sold to PKP Przewozy Regionalne. These locomotives have been modernized, the main transmission in EU07 has been changed. In addition, they received new livery, control sockets were dismantled, driver's cabs received thermal and acoustic insulation and new driver's and assistant's seats, and electric wipers and halogen headlights were installed. The locomotives have been renumbered from 1001 upwards.

In the years 2012-2013 5 EU07 of Przewozy Regionalne was rebuilt to EP07P type, they received a new numbering from 2001 onwards. The modernization included installation of static converter, WN and NN cabinets, new panels in driver's cabins, air conditioning and repair of traction motors. On the front a diode display was installed.

Nickname
Siódemka (The Seven) - from the number

See also
Polish locomotives designation

References

External links
PKP IC EP07 @ Trainspo
Modern Locos Gallery
Rail Service
Mikoleje
Chabówka Rail Museum

Pafawag locomotives
Bo′Bo′ locomotives
3000 V DC locomotives
Polish State Railways electric locomotives
Standard gauge locomotives of Poland

Bo′Bo′ electric locomotives of Europe